Nenad Perović (born 20 June 2002) is a Serbian footballer who currently plays as a forward for Mladost Lučani.

Career statistics

Club

Notes

References

2002 births
Living people
Serbian footballers
Serbia youth international footballers
Association football forwards
Serbian SuperLiga players
FK Mladost Lučani players